Ziya Movahed (in Persian: ضیاء موحد) is an Iranian poet and professor in philosophy. He obtained a B.Sc. in Physics at University of Tehran and a Ph.D. in Philosophy at University College London.

Critics on his works
 Critics on Movahed's poems by Hiva Massih
 Shakiba, Saeed, Critics on Movahed's poems

Awards and honors
Iran's book of the year award

Notes

References
 شکیبا، سعید. درباره ضیاء موحد در رادیو زمانه
 نقد کتاب ضیاء موحد
 زندگی‌نامه ضیاء موحد

20th-century Iranian poets
Living people
Philosophers of logic
21st-century Iranian philosophers
Alumni of University College London
Iranian logicians
1943 births
Researchers of Persian literature
21st-century Iranian poets